Bellville is a town in the Western Cape province of South Africa. It is situated adjacent to the Koelberg Mountains and also the University of Western Cape where it has its own campus.

Established 

It was founded as "12 Mile Post" (Afrikaans: "12-Myl-Pos") because it is located 12 miles (20 km) from Cape Town city centre. It was first known as "Hardekraaltjie". Founded as a railway station on the line from Cape Town to Stellenbosch and Strand, it was renamed Bellville in 1861 after the surveyor-general Charles Bell. The motor registration number bears the number CY.

Hospitals and educational institutes 
The Karl Bremer Hospital functioned as the Academic Hospital for the University of Stellenbosch Medical School, but now the adjacent Tygerberg Hospital houses the medical school. Other hospitals in Bellville are: Mediclinic International Louis Leipoldt and Melomed. The Cape Peninsula University of Technology, University of the Western Cape, University of Stellenbosch Business School and Northlink College are also situated in Bellville. D.F. Malan High School, Bellville High School, Westcliff School of Skills, The Settlers High School and Stellenberg High School are located in the area. Primary Schools are: Bellpark, Bellville, Bellville-North, Boston, Eversdal, Excelsior, Kenridge, Mimosa, Totius, Belville Islamic Primary School, Vredelust and Welgemoed.

Other places of interest 

The Bellville Velodrome is located in the Tyger Valley area of Bellville. The Bellville Velodrome has an indoor cycling track and is next to the Bellville athletics track that used to host the annual MTBS athletics competition. Bellville Mall, Tygervalley Shopping centre and Willow Bridge are shopping centres in Bellville. The last two shopping centres were built on the grounds that used to be a quarry and a jail.

Sanlam's head office is also located in Strand Road, Bellville.

Other sports an entertainment includes: Bellville Golf Course, Bellville library, Bellville swimming pool
, Cool runnings, Jack Muller Danie Uys Park (The Parkrun in Bellville is done here) and PP Smit Sport fields

The head office of the Bible society of South Africa is situated in the city

Tygerberg Nature Reserve is just above Welgemoed, one of Bellville's northern suburbs.

Geography 

Bellville is located about 65 to 275 m above sea level on the banks of the Elsieskraal River and at the foot of the Tygerberg Hill to the north-west of the town. The town is situated about 23 km north-east of Cape Town by road and 38 km south-west of Paarl by road.

Bellville is bordered by Durbanville to the north, the winelands of the Durbanville Wine Valley to the north-west, Brackenfell to the east, Kuilsrivier to the south-east, Belhar to the south and Parow to the west.

Suburbs 
Suburbs that form part of Bellville are: Amanda Glen, Bellair, Bellville South, Beroma, Bloemhof, Blommendal, Blomtuin, Bosbell, Boston, Chrismar, De la Haye, Door de Kraal, Eversdal Glenhaven, Greenlands, Groenvallei, Heemstede, Hoheizen, Kanonberg, Kenridge, La Rochelle, Labiance, Loevenstein, Mimosa, Oakdale, Oakglen, Oude Westhof, Protea Valley, Ridgeworth, Rosendal, Stellenberg, Stellenridge, Stellenryk, Stikland, Tygerberg Hills, Tygervalley, van Riebeeckshof, Vredelust, Vredenburg and Welgemoed.

Infrastructure

Road Transport 
Bellville is accessible via two freeways, the N1 is the main highway running through Bellville, from Cape Town in the south-west to Paarl and further to Bloemfontein, Johannesburg and Pretoria in the north-west. The N1 intersects three on and off-ramp interchanges in Bellville including the Jip de Jager Drive/Mike Pienaar Boulevard (Exit 20), Durban Road/Willie van Schoor Drive (Exit 23) and Old Oak Road (Exit 25) interchanges. The R300 (Kuils River Freeway) runs to the east of Bellville, bordering between the town and Brackenfell and Kuilsrivier to the east and runs from Mitchells Plain, 28 km to the south and terminates with the intersection with the N1 at the Stellenberg Interchange, between Bellville and Brackenfell. The R300 intersects three on and off-ramps interchanges in Bellville including the Van Riebeeck Road/Strand Road (Exit 25), Bottelary Road (Exit 26) and Old Paarl Road (Exit 29) interchanges. 

Other than the R300, Bellville is also at the centre of three regional routes including the R102 which passes through the town as its main road, “Voortrekker Road” as well as “Strand Road” from Parow in the east to Kuilsrivier and Somerset West in the south-west, the R101 which begins near the town centre as “Old Paarl Road” to Brackenfell in the east and the R302 which begins in the town centre as “Durban Road” to Durbanville and Malmesbury in the north.  

Bellville is connected by a network of metropolitan routes within the City of Cape Town given its central location within the metropolitan area. These metropolitan routes include the M10 (Robert Sobukwe Road) to the Cape Town International Airport, M11 (Tienie Meyer Bypass) bypassing the town centre to the south, M16 (Jip de Jager Drive; Mike Pienaar Boulevard; Francie van Zijl Drive) to the Tygerberg Hospital, Elsies River and Epping, M23 (Bottelary Road) to Brackenfell, Kuilsrivier and Stellenbosch, M25 (Frans Conradie Drive) to Brackenfell and Parow, M30 (Bill Bezuidenhout Avenue) connecting Chrismar to Tyger Valley, M31 (Tygerberg Valley Road; Old Oak Road; La Belle Road) connecting to Durbanville and Milnerton via the M13, M73 (Eversdal Road) to Durbanville and Brackenfell, M121 (Carl Cronje Drive) connecting Boston to Tyger Valley, M124 (Eversdal Road) to Durbanville, M171 (Symphony Way) to Delft and the M189 (Peter Barlow Drive) connecting the south-western suburbs of Bellville

Constituency 
The town was a constituency in the Cape Peninsula, Cape Town, Cape Province in the South African House of Assembly starting in 1933.  The first elected member was FHP Creswell (b. 13 November 1866, d. 28 August 1948). In 1939 it was not a constituency any more. In 1953 it regained constituency status and JFW Haak won. Haak retained this until 1970, when Louis Pienaar took over from him. In 1975 AT van der Merwe took over from him.

Municipality 
Bellville was a municipality from 1940 to 1996, and was given the status of a city on 7 September 1979.

Mayors of Bellville 
 1940–1943 van Niekerk, Andries Joseph (born 14 May 1882, died 30 April 1953) married Athalia Solms (born 4 August 1876)
 1943–1944 Blanckenberg, Josias Jacobus (born 10 March 1907, died 21 October 1992)
 1944–1949 van Niekerk, Andries Joseph. Second term see no 1
 1949–1950 Haak, Jan Friedrich Wilhelm (born 20 April 1917, died 16 February 1993) married Maria Smuts Theron (born 1 August 1917). Jan Haak was also the Minister of Economy in the South African Government from 1967 to 1970. He was also as member of the National Party South Africa the representative for Bellville in parliament
 1950–1952 Duminy, Hendrik Cornelis van Niekerk (born 6 September 1899, died 29 March 1974) married Frieda Moolman.
 1952–1953 Sacks, Alec (born 14 April 1913.,died 29 May 1974) married Anita Joseph(born 15 March 1922)
 1953–1954 West, Adam Johannes (born 7 August 1905, died 30 November 1983) married Maria Margaretha Visser. AJ West Street in Boston Bellville is named after him.
 1954–1956 Barnard, Johannes Hendrik (born 3 September 1891, died 17 October 1956) married Lucia Ruth Mosel. Barnard Street in Oakdale Bellville is named after him.
 1956–1958 Meyer, Petrus Hendrik (born 7 September 1926) married Stephanie Swart (born 20 November 1926)
 1958–1961 van Riet, Willem Frederik (born 11 July 1910, died 9 December 1988) married Augusta Dorothy de Villiers (born 31 August 1909)
 1961–1963 Pienaar, Michiel Hendrik de Wet (born 12 October 1900) married Anna Susanna Siebrits(born 22 May 1904) Mike Pienaar Boulevard in Bellville West is named after him.
 1963–1966 Bezuidenhout, Willem Johannes (born 12 October 1900) married Mona Havenga (born 12 January 1903). Bill Bezuidenhout Avenue in Blomtuin Bellville is named after him.
 1966–1969 Pienaar, Michiel Hendrik de Wet.Second term see no 11
 1969–1971 Smit, Pieter Philip (born 8 March 1917, died 10 October 1997). The PP Smit sport fields in Durban Road Bellville is named after him.
 1971–1973 Meyer, Martinus Daniel (born 21 June 1918) married Mary Elizabeth Weidemann (born 18 July 1925) . Tienie Meyer Bypass is named after him.
 1973–1975 de Jager, Josephus Jacobus (born 9 December 1912, died 7 July 2000) married Helena Claudina Nel(born 8 August 1912). Jip de Jager Drive in Welgemoed Bellville is named after him.
 1975–1977 Uys, Daniel(born 3 June 1932) married Beatrix Hendina Moorrees (born 5 September 1934). Danie Uys Park in Boston Bellville is named after him.
 1977–1978 van Schoor, Daniel Willem Jacobus (born 31 March 1935, died 14 August 2001) married Johanna Elizabeth Coetzee (born 2 September 1937). Willie van Schoor Drive in Bellville is named after him.
 1978–1979 de Jager, Josephus Jacobus. Second term see no 16
 1979–1981 Meyer, Martinus Daniel Second term see no 15
 1981–1983 Pienaar, Kristo Johannes (born 4 July 1922, died 6 April 1996) married Christina Wilhelmina van Rooyen (born 24 May 1921)
 1983–1985 Uys, Daniel. Second term see no 17
 1985–1986 Kleynhans, PH
 1986–1987 Meyer, Martinus Daniel. Third term see no 15
 1987–1989 Pienaar, Kristo Johannes. Second term see no 21
 1989–1991 van Schoor, Daniel Willem Jacobus. Second term see no 18
 1991–1994 Kempen, Abraham Petrus de Villiers (born 23 March 1920, died 29 June 2010) married Bramie Joubert (born 18 December 1919). The Awie Kempen Vehicle Testing Grounds is named after him.
 1994–1996 Cronje, Carl Peter Roche (born 10 July 1932, died 2 November 2018) married Miriam Lauretta Sadie.(born 7 April 1933). Carl Cronje Drive is named after him.
In April 1982 P. W. Botha received honorary citizenship of the city.

Coat of arms

The municipal council assumed a coat of arms on 18 June 1947. It later altered the arms, three times, before settling on the final version in 1979.
The shield was divided into twelve horizontal bars of red and gold, representing the original village name of "Twaalfmyl".  A black vertical band ("pale") down the centre displayed two silver hawk's bells, between which was a small blue shield displaying a golden sheaf of wheat.  The crest was a black eagle, and the motto Prendre sa belle.  Some time later, the blue shield was removed, and the wheatsheaf was placed directly on the black pale.  In 1957, the wheatsheaf was replaced with a third hawk's bell.  This version of the arms, re-drawn by Ivan Mitford-Barberton, was registered with the Cape Provincial Administration in February 1959.

The final version of the arms, as amended by Cornelis Pama in 1979, replaced the hawk's bells with church bells. In this form, the arms were registered at the Bureau of Heraldry in February 1980. The registered blazon was : Barry of twelve Gules and Or, on a pale Sable three church bells Argent.

Media 
In May 2007, Meg Ryan and William H. Macy completed the last day of photography for their movie, The Deal, at the Bellville Civic Centre.
The novel 2 Dae in Mei (English: 2 Days in May) by Jaco Fouché takes place in Bellville.

Notable people
Neil de Kock - South Africa national rugby union team player
Vernon Philander - South Africa national cricket team player
Yolandi Potgieter - South Africa national women's cricket team player
 Con de Lange – South Africa national cricket team player

References

External links
 Bellville Directory
 University of the Western Cape
 Bellville Business Directory

Suburbs of Cape Town
1861 establishments in the Cape Colony